Chen Siming (born 30 December 1993) is a Chinese professional pool player. Chen is best known for winning the 2017 WPA World Nine-ball Championship.

Career
Chen grew up in Heilongjiang Province, China, where her parents were owners of a pool hall, and she started playing snooker aged 8. Four years later, in 2006, she won both the 8-ball and 9-ball divisions of the Chinese National Youth Championships. By 2009 she was being coached by Wu Jia-qing (formerly known as Wu Chia-Ching), the double world champion. Within a year, she defeated Allison Fisher to win the 2010 China Open, her first major title.

In the 2010 Asian Games, Chen won the gold medal in the Six-red snooker event.

In 2011, she won her second senior title, the Philippine Open, defeating Kelly Fisher 9–3 in the final, and later won the All Japan Championship. Billiards Digest named Chen as 2011 player of the year.

Following further tournament successes, she won the 2017 Women's World 9-Ball Championship, coming from 1–5 down against Pan Xiaoting to win 9–7.

Achievements
2006 Chinese National Youth Championships 8-ball
2006 Chinese National Youth Championships 9-Ball
2009 Asian Games Six-Red Snooker
2010 Asian Games Six-Red Snooker
2010 China Open 9-Ball Championship
2011 Philippines Open – Ladies 10-ball
2011 All Japan Championship 9-Ball
2011 Billiards Digest Player of the Year 
2013 OB Cues Ladies Tour  
2013 Maryland State Women's Championship 
2017 CBSA World Chinese Eight-ball Championship
2017 WPA Amway Cup 9-Ball World Open
2017 China Open 9-Ball Championship
2017 All Japan Championship 9-Ball
2017 World Games Nine-ball Singles
2017 Asian Indoor and Martial Arts Games 10 Ball Singles
2017 WPA World Nine-ball Championship
2017 Dynamic Klagenfurt Open Ladies Division
2017 AZBilliards Player of the Year 
2018 WPA Amway Cup 9-Ball World Open
2019 WPBA Masters
2019 CBSA World Chinese Eight-ball Championship
2019 AZBilliards Player of the Year

References

External links

Living people
Female pool players
Chinese pool players
1993 births
Asian Games medalists in cue sports
Cue sports players at the 2010 Asian Games
Asian Games gold medalists for China
Asian Games silver medalists for China
Medalists at the 2010 Asian Games